The 2021 Florida State Seminoles baseball team represented Florida State University in the 2021 NCAA Division I baseball season. The Seminoles played their home games at Mike Martin Field at Dick Howser Stadium as a member of the Atlantic Coast Conference. They were led by head baseball coach Mike Martin, Jr. in his second year as head coach.

Previous season
In 2020, the Seminoles finished with an overall record of 12-5, 1-2 in ACC Conference play, including a win against then-unbeaten rival Florida, before the season was cancelled due to the COVID-19 pandemic.

Schedule

2021 MLB draft

References

External links 
 Florida State Baseball

Florida State Seminoles
Florida State Seminoles baseball seasons
Florida State Seminoles baseball
Florida State